Dare Bagh (also Romanized as Dar-e Bāgh; also known as Dar Bāgh, Dar-e Bāgh, and Darreh Bāgh) is a village in Kachu Rural District, in the Central District of Ardestan County, Isfahan Province, Iran. At the 2006 census, its population was 252, in 85 families.

References 

Populated places in Ardestan County